Kamal Bahadur Singh (29 September 1926 – 5 January 2020) was an Indian politician from Bihar. He was elected twice as a member of the Lok Sabha. He was the last Maharaja of Dumraon Raj. He was the last surviving member of the First Lok Sabha.

Early life
Singh was born on 29 September 1926. He studied in Colonel Brown Cambridge School and D. A. V. College. He also studied in Allahabad University and Patna Law College.

Career 
Singh was elected as a member of the Lok Sabha from Shahabad North West in the first Lok Sabha election. Later, he was elected from Buxar in 1957. He was the youngest member elected, and served until 1962.

Singh also ran for office again in 1989 and 1991, but lost both times.

Death 
Singh died on 5 January 2020 at the age of 93.

References

1926 births
2020 deaths
India MPs 1952–1957
India MPs 1957–1962
Independent politicians in India
Lok Sabha members from Bihar
Patna University alumni
People from Buxar district
University of Allahabad alumni